Christian David "Dummy" Lebey (July 16, 1896 – December 27, 1959) was a college football player.

Georgia Tech 

Lebey was a prominent guard for John Heisman and William Alexander's Georgia Tech Yellow Jackets of the Georgia Institute of Technology.   After school, he convinced Buck Flowers to enter the real estate loan business.

1920 

In 1920 he was selected second-team All-American by Lawrence Perry, "acknowledged authority on college sports," for the Consolidated Press.

1922 

Lebey was alternate captain behind Red Barron.

References 

1896 births
1959 deaths
American football guards
All-Southern college football players
Georgia Tech Yellow Jackets football players
Players of American football from Savannah, Georgia